Peffer may refer to:

William A. Peffer (1831–1912), United States Senator from Kansas
Nathaniel Peffer (1890, New York City - 1964), American researcher of Far East problems
Jordy Peffer (b. 1996), Belgian footballer

See also 
Pfeffer, Feffer
Pfeffermann
Pfefferbaum, Pfefferberg

Germanic-language surnames